Eucalantica is a genus of moths of the family Yponomeutidae. Species in the genus are superficially similar to Thecobathra species, which also have a silvery white body and forewings, but differ from the latter in having a dark brown costal streak in forewing.

When resting, Eucalantica moths lay their body parallel to the substrate with their forelegs extended forward.

Species
Eucalantica costaricae - Sohn & Nishida, 2011
Eucalantica ehecatlella - Sohn & Nishida, 2011
Eucalantica icarusella - Sohn & Nishida, 2011
Eucalantica polita - (Walsingham, 1881)
Eucalantica powelli - Sohn, 2011
Eucalantica pumila - Sohn, 2011
Eucalantica vaquero - Sohn, 2011

References

Yponomeutidae